In mathematics, the incompressibility method is a proof method like the probabilistic method, the counting method or the pigeonhole principle. To prove that an object in a certain class (on average) satisfies a certain property, select an object of that class that is incompressible. If it does not satisfy the property, it can be compressed by computable coding. Since it can be generally proven that almost all objects in a given class are incompressible, the argument demonstrates that almost all objects in the class have the property involved (not just the average). To select an incompressible object is ineffective, and cannot be done by a computer program. However, a simple counting argument usually shows that almost all objects of a given class can be compressed by only a few bits (are incompressible).

History
The incompressibility method depends on an objective, fixed notion of incompressibility. Such a notion was provided by the Kolmogorov complexity theory, named for Andrey Kolmogorov.

One of the first uses of the incompressibility method with Kolmogorov complexity in the theory of computation was to prove that the running time of a one-tape Turing machine is quadratic for accepting a palindromic language and sorting algorithms require at least  time to sort  items. One of the early influential papers using the incompressibility method was published in 1980. The method was applied to a number of fields, and its name was coined in a textbook.

Applications

Number theory
According to an elegant Euclidean proof, there is an infinite number of prime numbers. Bernhard Riemann demonstrated that the number of primes less than a given number is connected with the 0s of the Riemann zeta function. Jacques Hadamard and Charles Jean de la Vallée-Poussin proved in 1896 that this
Using the incompressibility method, G. J. Chaitin argued as follows:  Each  can be described by its prime factorization  (which is unique), where  are the first  primes which are (at most)  and the exponents (possibly) 0. Each exponent is (at most) , and can be described by  bits. To describe  requires only  bits. Using the incompressibility of most positive integers, for each  there is a positive integer  of binary length  which cannot be described in fewer than  bits.
 

Since  is incompressible, the length of this description must exceed . To parse the first block of the description  must be given in prefix form , where  is an arbitrary, small, positive function. Therefore, . This shows that the expression below holds for this special sequence, and a simple extension shows that it holds for every :

Both proofs are presented in more detail.

Graph theory
A labeled graph  with  nodes can be represented by a string  of  bits, where each bit indicates the presence (or absence) of an edge between the pair of nodes in that position. , and the degree  of each vertex satisfies

This theorem is required in a more complicated proof, where the incompressibility argument is used a number of times to show that the number of unlabeled graphs is

Combinatorics
A transitive tournament is a complete directed graph, ; if , . Consider the set of all transitive tournaments on  nodes. Since a tournament is a labeled, directed complete graph, it can be encoded by a string  of  bits where each bit indicates the direction of the edge between the pair of nodes in that position. Using this encoding, every transitive tournament contains a transitive subtournament on (at least)  vertices with

This was shown as the first problem.

If a number of events are independent (in probability theory) of one another, the probability that none of the events occur can be easily calculated. If the events are dependent, the problem becomes difficult. Lovász local lemma is a principle that if events are mostly independent of one another and have an individually-small probability, there is a positive probability that none of them will occur. It was proven by the incompressibility method. Using the incompressibility method, several versions of expanders and superconcentrator graphs were shown to exist.

Topological combinatorics

In the Heilbronn triangle problem, throw  points in the unit square and determine the maximum of the minimal area of a triangle formed by three of the points over all possible arrangements. The original conjecture of Heilbronn was  during the early 1950s. The general problem remains unsolved, apart from the best-known lower bound  (achievable; hence, Heilbronn's conjecture is not correct for general ) and upper bound  (proven by Komlos, Pintsz and Szemeredi in 1982 and 1981, respectively). Using the incompressibility method, the average case was studied. It was proven that if the area is too small (or large) it can be compressed below the Kolmogorov complexity of a uniformly-random arrangement (high Kolmogorov complexity). In this case, the incompressibility method proves the lower and upper bounds of the property involved.

Probability
The law of the iterated logarithm, the law of large numbers and the recurrence property were shown to hold using the incompressibility method and Kolmogorov's zero–one law, with normal numbers expressed as binary strings (in the sense of E. Borel) and the distribution of 0s and 1s in binary strings of high Kolmogorov complexity.

Turing-machine time complexity
The basic Turing machine, as conceived by Alan Turing in 1936, consists of a memory: a tape of potentially-infinite cells on which a symbol can be written and a finite control, with a read-write head attached, which scans a cell on the tape. At each step, the read-write head can change the symbol in the cell being scanned and move one cell left, right, or not at all according to instruction from the finite control. Turing machines with two tape symbols may be considered for convenience, but this is not essential.

In 1968, F. C. Hennie showed that such a Turing machine requires order  to recognize the language of binary palindromes in the worst case. In 1977, W. J. Paul presented an incompressibility proof which showed that order  time is required in the average case. For every integer , consider all words of that length. For convenience, consider words with the middle third of the word consisting of 0s. The accepting Turing machine ends with an accept state on the left (the beginning of the tape). A Turing-machine computation of a given word gives for each location (the boundary between adjacent cells) a sequence of crossings from left to right and right to left, each crossing in a particular state of the finite control. In the latter case, the word (if it is a palindrome) can be identified by that crossing sequence.

If other palindromes (ending in an accepting state on the left) have the same crossing sequence, the word (consisting of a prefix up to the position of the involved crossing sequence) of the original palindrome concatenated with a suffix the remaining length of the other palindrome would be accepted as well.

Since the overwhelming majority of binary palindromes have a high Kolmogorov complexity, this gives a lower bound on the average-case running time. The result is much more difficult, and shows that Turing machines with  work tapes are more powerful than those with  work tapes in real time (here one symbol per step).

More results concerning tapes, stacks and queues, deterministically and nondeterministically, were proven with the incompressibility method.

Theory of computation
Heapsort is a sorting method, invented by J. W. J. Williams and refined by R. W. Floyd, which always runs in  time. It is questionable whether Floyd's method is better than Williams' on average, although it is better in the worst case. Using the incompressibility method, it was shown that Williams' method runs on average in  time and Floyd's method runs on average in  time. The proof was suggested by Ian Munro.

Shellsort, discovered by Donald Shell in 1959, is a comparison sort which divides a list to be sorted into sublists and sorts them separately. The sorted sublists are then merged, reconstituting a partially-sorted list. This process repeats a number of times (the number of passes). The difficulty of analyzing the complexity of the sorting process is that it depends on the number  of keys to be sorted, on the number  of passes and the increments governing the scattering in each pass; the sublist is the list of keys which are the increment parameter apart. Although this sorting method inspired a large number of papers, only the worst case was established. A general lower bound on an average -pass Shellsort was given which was the first advance in this problem in four decades. In every pass, the comparison sort moves a key to another place a certain distance (a path length). All these path lengths are logarithmically coded for length in the correct order (of passes and keys). This allows the reconstruction of the unsorted list from the sorted list. If the unsorted list is incompressible (or nearly so), since the sorted list has near-zero Kolmogorov complexity (and the path lengths together give a certain code length) the sum must be at least as large as the Kolmogorov complexity of the original list. This was improved to a lower bound of 

where . This implies for example the Jiang-Li-Vitanyi lower bound for all -pass increment sequences and improves that lower bound for particular increment sequences;
the Janson-Knuth upper bound is matched by a lower bound for the used increment sequence, showing that three pass Shellsort for this increment sequence uses  inversions.

Logic
According to Gödel's first incompleteness theorem, in every formal system with computably enumerable theorems (or proofs) strong enough to contain Peano arithmetic, there are true (but unprovable) statements or theorems. This is proved by the incompressibility method; every formal system  can be described finitely (for example, in  bits). In such a formal system, we can express  since it contains arithmetic. Given  and a natural number , we can search exhaustively for a proof that some string  of length  satisfies . In this way, we obtain the first such string; : contradiction.

Comparison with other methods
Although the probabilistic method generally shows the existence of an object with a certain property in a class, the incompressibility method tends to show that the overwhelming majority of objects in the class (the average, or the expectation) have that property. It is sometimes easy to turn a probabilistic proof into an incompressibility proof or vice versa. In some cases, it is difficult or impossible to turn a proof by incompressibility into a probabilistic (or counting proof). In virtually all the cases of Turing-machine time complexity cited above, the incompressibility method solved problems which had been open for decades; no other proofs are known. Sometimes a proof by incompressibility can be turned into a proof by counting, as happened in the case of the general lower bound on the running time of Shellsort.

References

Mathematical principles
Computability theory
Information theory